Hong Myong-hui or Hong Myung-hee (July 3, 1888 – March 5, 1968) was a Korean novelist during the colonial period, and later a North Korean novelist and state official.

He was born in Dongbu-ri, Goesan county, Chungcheongbuk-do, where he took part in the 3.1 Movement in 1919. In the 1920s, he served as an editor of the Donga Ilbo. Hong also was part of the Korean nationalist group Singanhoe which was founded in 1927.

Hong founded the Democratic Independent Party with his comrades An Jae-hong, Kim Ho, Pak Yong-hee,  and Kim Won-yong on 19 October 1947. Hong then became the chairman of the party. After the Korean War, he occupied various important positions in North Korea.

He is buried in the Patriotic Martyrs' Cemetery in Hyongjesan-guyok, Pyongyang, North Korea. His grandson, Hong Sok-jung, is also a well known North Korean author.

Works
 Im Kkokjong (임꺽정) -historical novel based on the life of the Korean rebel Im Kkokjong (d.1562).

See also
Korean literature

References

 Hong Myong-hui: Korea's Finest Historical Novelist." Korea Journal 39:4 (Winter 1999): 36-60
 http://www.cybernk.net/infoText/InfoHumanDetail.aspx?mc=EJ1005&hid=EJ100500230287&rightType=3&direct=1

Links 

Grave of Hong Myong Hui

1888 births
1968 deaths
North Korean atheists
Korean socialists
Korean independence activists
North Korean novelists
Korean novelists
Literature of Korea under Japanese rule
Kim Won-bong
South Korean defectors
People from Goesan County
South Korean emigrants to North Korea
Members of the 1st Supreme People's Assembly
Members of the 2nd Supreme People's Assembly
Members of the 3rd Supreme People's Assembly
Members of the 4th Supreme People's Assembly
Korean Esperantists